Indolizine is an heterocyclic compound with the formula C8H7N). It is an uncommon isomer of indole with the nitrogen located at a ring fusion position. The saturated analogs are indolizidine, which are found in a variety of alkaloids such as swainsonine.

References

External links
 Chemical synthesis of indolizines